The Museum of Metz (Musée de la Cour d'Or - Metz Métropole), in Metz, France, was founded in 1839. It is a labyrinthine organization of rooms, incorporating the ancient Petites Carmes Abbey, the Chèvremont granary, and the Trinitaires church. The institution is organized into four broad sections:
The history and archeological museum, containing rich collections of Gallo-Roman finds — extension works to the museums in the 1930s revealed the vestiges of Gallo-Roman baths;
The medieval department;
The museum of architecture;
The museum of fine arts.

The museum recreates the world of the ancient and medieval city's inhabitants.

References

External links 

 Musée de la Cour d'Or - Metz Métropole
 Mairie de Metz
 Metz Métropole

Museums established in 1839
Buildings and structures in Metz
Archaeological museums in France
Architecture museums
Art museums and galleries in France
Military and war museums in France
Metz
1839 establishments in France
Museums of ancient Rome in France
Tourist attractions in Metz